Cerynea contentaria is a moth of the family Erebidae first described by Francis Walker in 1861.

This species is found in areas of Sri Lanka and Borneo.

References

Moths of Asia
Moths described in 1861
Boletobiinae